Arctic Monkeys are an English indie rock band who have recorded over 100 songs during their career. Formed in Sheffield in 2002, the group gained popularity in England before releasing their debut EP Five Minutes with Arctic Monkeys in 2005 on their own Bang Bang Recordings label, featuring the songs "Fake Tales of San Francisco" and "From the Ritz to the Rubble". After signing with Domino the same year, the group released their debut studio album Whatever People Say I Am, That's What I'm Not in 2006. It features songs influenced by indie rock, garage rock revival, post-punk revival, punk rock, and alternative rock, Lyrically, it analyses "the lives of young Northern England clubbers". Soon after recording the EP Who the Fuck Are Arctic Monkeys? (2006), the group released their second album Favourite Worst Nightmare in 2007. The album is noted as containing a harder and more aggressive sound than their debut, with lyrics exploring failed relationships, nostalgia and growing old.

The group's third album, Humbug, was released in 2009. Due to the influence of the album's producer, Queens of the Stone Age frontman Josh Homme, Humbug marked a change in sound for the band, showing influences of psychedelic rock, hard rock, stoner rock, and desert rock. The lyrics are also more visually abstract compared to their previous releases. For the band's fourth album Suck It and See (2011), the band explored different musical styles, including guitar pop, indie rock, and psychedelic pop. It further features slower, love-themed ballads than the fast-paced, rockier songs that typify the band's earlier sound.

After releasing the single "R U Mine?" in 2012, the group released their fifth album AM the following year. It features a wide array of influences, from blues rock to hip hop.  Thematically, the album concerns frustration surrounding tainted romance, sex and loneliness. Their sixth album, Tranquility Base Hotel & Casino (2018), took on a different direction, substituting the guitar-heavy sound from their previous albums for a more complex, piano-based style of composition, psychedelic pop, lounge pop, space pop, and glam rock influences. A concept album depicting a luxury hotel at Tranquility Base, the location of the 1969 Moon landing, it is heavily influenced by works of science fiction, consumerism, fam, religion and technology, and features the perspectives of multiple unreliable narrator.

Songs

Notes

References

Arctic Monkeys